John H. Hammergren is an American businessman. He is best known for his role as Chairman and CEO of McKesson Corporation since 1999. On November 1, 2018 Hammergren announced his plan to retire. On April 1, 2019, he officially retired from McKesson. He was succeeded by Brian Tyler.

Early life
John Hammergren was born in St. Paul, Minnesota on 20 February 1959. His father was a traveling salesman in the healthcare industry.

After having attended University of Minnesota, Hammergren received an MBA from William College Of Business at Xavier University.

Career
Hammergren began his career at American Hospital Supply that was subsequently purchased by Baxter Healthcare.

In 1996, Hammergren was hired by McKesson to run the Pharmaceutical division at McKesson. In 1999, soon after McKesson's fraud scandal, he was named president and co-CEO of the company, becoming sole CEO in 2001, and chairman of the board in 2002.

McKesson

Hammergren was elected president and CEO of McKesson in 2001 and chairman in 2002. In 2017, McKesson was involved in a number of lawsuits against the state of Arkansas over the supply of vecuronium bromide.
Lawsuits alleged that McKesson directors paid little attention to oversight of opioid sales after a 2008 settlement centering on the company's insufficient monitoring of such shipments. The lawsuit involved 10 existing and former executives and directors, including Hammergren.
Hammergren was criticized for his pay given the controversy surrounding the company's role in the opioid epidemic and failure to report suspicious opioid orders. Hammergren's annual bonus pay was increased to amount of $1.1 million in 2017.  The International Brotherhood of Teamsters, who own shares in the company, said of the bonus pay issue: “It is staggering that Hammergren received a $1.1 million boost to his bonus just months after the company announced it had reached a record $150 million settlement with the DEA in a year the company faces mounting litigation, negative press and Congressional scrutiny.” The union urged shareholders to vote against Hammergren's compensation package at the company's annual shareholder meeting.

Hewlett-Packard

In 2005, John Hammergren was elected to Hewlett-Packard's board of directors. Hammergren served until 2013 when he left the board.
New York City's public pension funds supported the efforts to oust two Hammergren and G. Kennedy Thompson because of their support for the company's 2011 acquisition of British software maker Autonomy and "their failure to protect investors from costly, misguided acquisitions." Hammergren received less than 60 percent of the vote for reelection at the 2013 annual shareholder vote and subsequently resigned.

Highest paid CEO
In December 2011 it was revealed that Hammergren was the highest paid CEO in the US with total remuneration in excess of $700m.

In June 2014, Glenn Gray, a former employee at McKesson returned to the company's annual meeting to ask that Hammergren's $292 million severance package be redistributed to low-paid employees. The proposal was defeated by the shareholders. He had also earlier, in 2013, 4 months before being relieved from his duties at McKesson, asked for wage raises during the company's annual meeting too.

According to a Bloomberg Pay Index, Hammergren had taken home $781 million as of July 2017, since becoming sole CEO at McKesson in 2001.

Rewards
Best-performing CEOs in the world by the Harvard Business Review (ranked #53 in 2014, #63 in 2015)

Other tenures
Chairman of the Supervisory Board of Celesio AG
Member of the Healthcare Leadership Council
Member of the board of trustees for the Center for Strategic & International Studies
Member of Hewlett-Packard's board of directors (2005-2013)

Book

References

External links 
"Reference for Business Entry on John H Hammergren"

American chief executives of Fortune 500 companies
1959 births
Living people
University of Minnesota alumni
Xavier University alumni
American corporate directors
American chairpersons of corporations
20th-century American businesspeople